The Griko people, also known as Grecanici in Calabria, are an ethnic Greek community of Southern Italy. They are found principally in regions of Calabria and Apulia (peninsula of Salento). The Griko are believed to be remnants of the once large Ancient and Medieval Greek communities of southern Italy (the ancient Magna Graecia region), although there is dispute among scholars as to whether the Griko community is directly descended from Ancient Greeks or from more recent medieval migrations during the Byzantine domination.

A long-standing debate over the origin of the Griko dialect has produced two main theories about the origins of Griko. According to the first theory, developed by Giuseppe Morosi in 1870, Griko originated from the Hellenistic Koine when in the Byzantine era [...] waves of immigrants arrived from Greece to Salento. Some decades after Morosi, G. Rohlfs, in the wake of Hatzidakis (1892), claimed instead that Griko was a local variety evolved directly from the ancient Greek.

Greek people have been living in Southern Italy for millennia, initially arriving in Southern Italy in numerous waves of migrations, from the ancient Greek colonisation of Southern Italy and Sicily in the 8th century BC through to the Byzantine Greek migrations of the 15th century caused by the Ottoman conquest. In the Middle Ages, Greek regional communities were reduced to isolated enclaves. Although most Greek inhabitants of Southern Italy have become entirely Italianized over the centuries, the Griko community has been able to preserve their original Greek identity, heritage, language and distinct culture, although exposure to mass media has progressively eroded their culture and language.

The Griko people traditionally speak Italiot Greek (the Griko or Calabrian dialects), which is a form of the Greek language. In recent years, the number of Griko who speak the Griko language has been greatly reduced; the younger Griko have rapidly shifted to Italian. Today, the Griko are Catholics.

Name
The name Griko derives from the traditional name for Greeks on the Italian peninsula, it is believed to derive from the Graecians, an ancient Hellenic tribe which according to legend took their name from Graecus. They were one of the first Greek tribes to colonize Italy. The area that came to be known as Magna Graecia took its name after them. The Latins used this term in reference to all Hellenic people because the first Hellenes they came into contact with were the Graecians, hence the name Greeks. Another opinion is that the ethnonym Γρῆκος/-α does not derive linguistically from either Latin Graecus or Greek Graikos; it may have been the term their ancient Italic neighbors used for local Greek speakers in pre-Roman times, although this is only one linguistic hypothesis among many.

Distribution

The Greek-speaking territory of Bovesia lies in very mountainous terrain and is not easily accessible. In recent times, many descendants of the early inhabitants of the area have left the mountains to set up home by the coast. The Griko-speakers of Calabria live in the villages of Bova Superiore, Bova Marina, Roccaforte del Greco, Condofuri, Palizzi, Gallicianò and Mélito di Porto Salvo. In 1999 the Italian Parliament extended the historical Griko territories by Act 482 to include the towns of Palizzi, San Lorenzo, Staiti, Samo, Montebello Jonico, Bagaladi, Motta San Giovanni, Brancaleone and parts of Reggio. In the Grecia Salentina region of Apulia, the Griko-speakers are to be found in the villages of Calimera, Martignano, Martano, Sternatia, Zollino, Corigliano d'Otranto, Soleto, Melpignano and Castrignano dei Greci, although Grico seems to be disappearing from Martignano, Soleto and Melpignano. Towns populated by the Griko people outside the Bovesia and Grecia Salentina regions have almost entirely lost the knowledge of their Griko language; this occurred largely in the late 19th and 20th centuries. Some towns that have lost the knowledge of the Griko tongue include the cities of Cardeto, Montebello, San Pantaleone and Santa Caterina in Calabria. At the beginning of the nineteenth century today's nine Greek-speaking cities of the Grecía Salentina area along with Sogliano Cavour, Cursi, Cannole and Cutrofiano formed part of the Decatría Choría (τα Δεκατρία Χωρία) the thirteen cities of Terra d'Otranto who preserved the Greek language and traditions. At a more remote period Greek was also spoken by a prevalent Greek population in Galatina, Galatone, Gallipoli and many other localities of Apulia, and at Catanzaro and Cosenza in Calabria.

Villages in Italy

The Griko villages usually have two names, an Italian one as well as a native Griko name by which villagers refer to the town. The Griko villages are typically divided into small "islands" in the areas of southern Italy:

 Apulia
 Province of Salento (Grecía Salentina)
 Calimera
 Cannole: Cánnula
 Caprarica Crapáreca
 Carpignano Salentino: Carpignána
 Castrignano dei Greci: Castrignána or Cascignána
 Corigliano d’Otranto: Choriána or Coriána
 Cursi Cúrze
 Cutrofiano: Cutrufiána
 Martano: Martána
 Martignano: Martignána
 Melpignano: Lipignána
 Soleto: Sulítu
 Sternatia: i Chora (η Χώρα) and Starnaítta
 Zollino: Tzuddhínu
 Galatina As Pétro
 Province of Salento (outside Grecia Salentina)
Alliste
 San Pietro Vernotico Santu Piethru
 Cellino San Marco
 Francavilla Fontana'
 Galatone Galátuna
 Gallipoli Caddhípuli
 Lecce (in various regions): Luppìu
 Manduria
 Maruggio
 San Cesario di Lecce
 Squinzano
 Taviano
 Vernole
Otranto Derentó/Terentó
 Calabria; Calabrian Greece region 
 Africo: Άφρικον 
 Amendolea: Amiddalia 
 Armo
 Bagaladi: Bagalades
 Bova: Chòra tu Vùa (Βοῦα), i Chora (ἡ Χώρα)
 Bova Marina: Jalo tu Vùa
 Brancaleone
 Cardeto: Kardia
 Cataforio: Katachòrio
 Condofuri: Kontofyria, o Condochòri (Κοντοχώρι «near the village»)
 Gallicianò
 Gerace
 Laganadi: Lachanàdi, Lachanàdes
 Lubrichi
 Mélito di Porto Salvo: Mèlitos or Mèlito
 Montebello
 Mosorrofa: Messòchora
 Motta San Giovanni
 Palizzi: Spiròpoli
 Paracorio merged in 1878 with the town of Pedovoli into the present town of Delianuova: Dhelia
 Pentedattilo
 Podàrgoni: Podàrghoni
 Polistena
 Reggio di Calabria Rìghi
 Roccaforte del Greco: Vuni (Βουνί «Mountain»)
 Roghudi: Roghudion, Choriò, Richudi (ῥηχώδης «rock»)
 Samo: Samu
 San Pantaleone
 San Lorenzo
 Santa Caterina
 San. Giorgio
 Scido: Skidous
 Sinopoli: Xenòpolis, Sinopolis
 Sitizzano
 Staiti: Stàti
 La Piana di Monteleone region
 Calimera
 Dinami: Dynamis
 Filandari: Philandaris
 Garopoli
 Ierocarne
 Ionadi: Ionades 
 Orsigliadi
 Papaglionti
 Paravati
 Potame
 Melicuca: Melikukià
 Mesima
 Stefanaconi
 Triparni

Official status 
By Law no. 482 of 1999, the Italian parliament recognized the Griko communities of Reggio Calabria and Salento as a Greek ethnic and linguistic minority. This states that the Republic protects the language and culture of its Albanian, Catalan, Germanic, Greek, Slovene, and Croat populations, and of those who speak French, Provençal, Friulian, Ladin, Occitan, and Sardinian.

History

Early migrations

The first Greek contacts with Italy are attested since prehistoric period, when Mycenaean Greeks established settlements in Central and Southern Italy and Sicily. In ancient times the Italian Peninsula south of Naples including the coasts of Calabria, Lucania, Apulia, Campania and Sicily were colonized by the Ancient Greeks beginning in the 8th century BC. The Greek settlements were so densely collected there that during the Classical period the region came to be called Magna Graecia (Greater Greece). Greeks continued to migrate to these regions in many waves from antiquity until as late as the Byzantine migrations of the 15th century.

Later migrations

During the Early Middle Ages, following the disastrous Gothic War, new waves of Greeks came to Magna Graecia from Greece and Asia Minor, as Southern Italy remained loosely governed by the Byzantine Empire. The iconoclast emperor Leo III appropriated lands in southern Italy that had been granted to the Papacy, and the Eastern Emperor loosely governed the area until the advent of the Lombards; then, in the form of the Catapanate of Italy, they were superseded by the Normans. Moreover, the Byzantines would have found in Southern Italy people of common cultural roots, the Greek-speaking eredi ellenofoni of Magna Graecia. The Greek language never died out entirely in southern Italy, although the area in which it was spoken was significantly reduced by the progression of Latin. Records of Magna Graecia being predominantly Greek-speaking, date as late as the eleventh century (the end of Byzantine domination in Southern Italy). During this time, parts of Southern Italy that were reintegrated into the Byzantine Empire, began to experience significant demographic shifts as Greeks began to settle regions further north such as Cilento, which had an overwhelmingly Greek population by the time of the Norman conquest.

Around the end of the Middle Ages, large parts of Calabria, Lucania, Salento, and Sicily continued to speak Greek as their mother tongue. During the 13th century a French chronicler passing through the whole of Calabria stated that “the peasants of Calabria spoke nothing but Greek”. In 1368 the Italian scholar Petrarch recommended a stay in Calabria to a student who needed to improve his knowledge of Greek. The Griko people were the dominant population element of some regions of Calabria and the Salento until the 16th century.  During the fifteenth and sixteenth centuries a slow process of Catholicization and Latinization of the Greek populations of southern Italy and Sicily would reduce the Greek language and culture further. Antonio de Ferraris, a Greek born in Galatone in 1444, observed how the inhabitants of Kallipoli (Gallipoli in Salento) as still conversing in their original Greek mother tongue, he indicated that the Greek classical tradition had remained alive in this region of Italy and that the population is probably of Lacedaemonian (Spartan) stock. The Greek of Southern Italy, although greatly reduced, remained active in isolated enclaves in Calabria and Salento. Even after the Middle Ages there were sporadic migrations from mainland Greece. Thus, considerable numbers of refugees entered the region in the 16th and 17th centuries. This happened in reaction to the conquest of the Peloponnese by the Ottomans.

During the 20th century the use of the Griko language was considered, even by many of the Griko themselves, as a symbol of backwardness and an obstacle to their progress, parents would discourage their children from speaking the dialect and students who were caught talking Griko in class were chastised. For many years the Griko of Calabria and Salento have been forgotten. Even in Greece, Greeks were unaware of their existence.

Griko national awakening

The Griko national awakening began in Grecia Salentina through the labors of Vito Domenico Palumbo (1857–1918), a Griko native of the town of Calimera. Palumbo embarked on to re-establishing cultural contacts with mainland Greece.  He studied the folklore, mythology,  tales and popular songs of the Griko of Magna Graecia. The revival of attention is also due to the pioneering work of the German linguist and philologist Gerhard Rohlfs, who contributed much to the documentation and preservation of the Griko language. Professor Ernesto Aprile of Calimera viewed his community support for preservation and growth of Griko poetry, history, and performance as a civic responsibility until his death in 2008, and published multiple monographs on the subject for local and national dissemination, acting as recognized—but unofficial—ambassador to visitors and dignitaries to Calimera and the sea-side sections of Melendugno nearby.

Culture

Music

The Griko have a rich folklore and oral tradition. Griko songs, music and poetry are popular in Italy and Greece and famous music groups from Salento include Ghetonia and Aramirè. Also, influential Greek artists such as George Dalaras, Dionysis Savvopoulos, Marinella, Haris Alexiou and Maria Farantouri have performed in the Griko language. Every summer in Melpignano, a small town of Salento, there is the famous Notte della Taranta festival, it is attended by thousands of young people dancing all night to the tune of Pizzica and Griko Salentino dialect. An increased exposure to mass media has increasingly eroded the Griko culture and language.

Other music groups of Griko music include, from Salento: Agrikò, Argalìo, Arakne Mediterranea, Astèria, Atanathon, Avleddha, Briganti di Terra d'Otranto, Canzoniere Grecanico Salentino, Officina Zoè, Ghetonia; from Calabria: Astaki, Nistanimera, Stella del Sud, Ta scipòvlita; and from Greece: Encardia.  Encardia was the subject of a documentary film called “Encardia, the Dancing Stone,” inspired by and celebrating the music of the Griko people.

Language

The Griko's ancestral mother-tongue forms two distinctive Greek dialects, which are collectively known as Katoitaliotika (literally "Southern Italian"), Grecanika and/or Griko language, both mutually intelligible to some extent with Standard Modern Greek. The Griko people in Apulia speak the Griko dialect, as opposed to the Calabrian dialect spoken in Calabria. These dialects, survived far into the Middle Ages and even into these days, preserve features, sounds, grammar and vocabulary of Ancient Greek, spoken in Magna Graecia by the ancient Greek colonists, Koine Greek and medieval Byzantine Greek.

The Griko language is classified as severely endangered, as the number of speakers has diminished in recent decades due to language shift to Italian. Today it is roughly spoken by 20,000 predominantly elderly people, while the youngest speakers tend to be over thirty years old and only a few child speakers exist. The Griko language and the local romance languages (Calabrese and Salentino) heavily influenced each other throughout centuries.

The Ndrangheta which is the name of the Calabrian Mafia is a word of Calabrian Greek origin: andragathía (ἀνδραγαθία), composed by "agathia" ("value") and "andròs" (genitive of "anér" with the meaning of "noble man").

The Italian government does little to protect the progressively eroding language and culture of the Griko people despite Article 6 of the Italian Constitution which authorizes the preservation of ethnic minorities.  The use of the Italian language is compulsory in public schools, the Griko language, on the other hand, is not taught to Griko youth at all.

Religion

Before the East-West Schism, the Grikos were Catholics who adhered to the Byzantine Rite. Some Greeks of Southern Italy managed to rise to positions of power in the Church, like Pope John VII and Antipope John XVI. In the 11th century the Normans overran southern Italy, and soon Bari, the last Byzantine outpost, fell to them. They began a process of Latinization. The Greek clergy eventually adopted Latin for the Mass, although Greek resistance to the Latin rite was prolonged in Calabria. Latin prelates were not established at Cosenza, Bisignano and Squillace until 1093–6. In 1093 the Norman King Roger attempted to install a Latin archbishop over the overwhelmingly Greek population of Rossano, however this was a complete failure, a revolt took place in favour of restoring the Byzantine rite. At Crotone, Bova, and Gerace the clergy continued to use the Greek liturgy even though they were under Latin bishops. In Salento, where the Normans took a less intense attitude to the Latinisation of the people, the Griko people continued to speak the Greek language and to celebrate the Byzantine rite. Some Griko in both Calabria and Salento remained adherents to the Byzantine rite to the 13th-14th century. Today, the Griko people are Catholics who adhere to the Latin Rite.

Literature

Early Griko literature

Contemporary literature

Cuisine
The traditional cuisine of Salento and Calabria has been heavily influenced by Griko culture. The Griko are traditionally producers of cereals, vegetables, olives and legumes. Local Griko cuisine does not differ greatly from the local Italian population, however there local regional variations. Many typical Griko dishes are still in use among them. Some of them are mentioned below.

Pitta and Lestopitta - a traditional Greek-Calabrian bread from the Bovesia region
Ciceri e ttrìa - A form of Tagliatelle served with chickpeas. Traditionally this dish was consumed on the feast of Saint Joseph on 19 March in Grecia Salentina.
Cranu stompatu -  a wheat dish, prepared in a simple way, by soaking and pounding the wheat
ricchiteddhe - type of macaroni
minchiarieddhi  - a type of long macaroni
sagne ncannulate  - a wide tagliatelle up to inch and a half
triddhi - irregular shaped pasta, specifically used for making Broth
Mendulata te cranu - a dessert similar to Pastiera, filled with cream cheese, honey, sugar and vanilla
Le Cuddhure - a traditional Griko cake made during Easter, from the Greek Koulouri
Tiaulicchiu - Hot Chili peppers, extensively eaten throughout Grecia Salentina, they are usually stored dry, or preserved in jars of oil, with the addition of slivers of garlic, mint, and capers
Sceblasti  - a traditional type of hand made bread from the Grecia Salentina region.
Aggute - a traditional Greek-Calabrian Easter bread from the Bovesia region, it is prepared with a mixture of flour, eggs and butter and the surface is decorated with painted hard boiled eggs, similar to the Greek Tsoureki
Scardateddhi - traditional Greek-Calabrian wedding sweets, made from flour, honey and anise seeds which are shaped like small doughnuts. They are then cooked in boiling water, and sprinkled with brown sugar before being served.

A book about the cuisine of the Griko of Salento has been published,  entitled Grecia Salentina la Cultura Gastronomica. It features many traditional recipes distinctive to the Grecia Salentina region of southern Apulia.

Notable people

Pope Anterus (died 236)
Pope John VII (c. 650–707)
Pope Zachary (679–752)
Nilus the Younger (910–1005), a saint born to a Greek family in Rossano, Calabria.
Antipope John XVI (c. 945–1001), of Greek origin from Rossano, Calabria.
Barlaam of Seminara (c. 1290–1348), Aristotelian scholastic scholar and clergyman of the 14th century.
Leontius Pilatus (died 1366), Greek Calabrian scholar, was one of the earliest promoters of Greek studies in Western Europe.
Antonio de Ferrariis (c. 1444–1517), Greek scholar, academic, doctor and humanist from Galatone, Apulia.
Sergio Stiso (c. 1458–16th century), priest of the Greek-Catholic Rite, humanist, philosopher and theologian from Zollino, Apulia.
Vito Domenico Palumbo (c. 1854–1918), writer and poet.
Domenicano Tondi (1885–1965), writer and poet.
Tony Bennett (New York, August 3, 1926), Italian-American singer of popular music, standards, show tunes, and jazz whose paternal ancestors were originally from the Griko town of Podargoni in Calabria. His ancestors immigrated from Calabria to the United States where Tony was later born.
Franco Corliano (in Griko: Frangos Korlianòs) (born Calimera, 1948 - died 2015), poet, songwriter, painter.
Rocco Aprile (born Calimera, 1929 - died Calimera, 2014, historian, linguist.
Ernesto Aprile (-2008), scientist.
Dorotea Mercuri, 1974, model, actress.
Elena D'Angri, 1821, opera singer

See also
 Griko language
 Greek diaspora

References

Sources
Stavroula Pipyrou. The Grecanici of Southern Italy: Governance, Violence, and Minority Politics. Philadelphia: University of Pennsylvania Press, 2016. .

External links

  Enosi Griko, Coordination of Grecìa Salentina Associations
 Mi mu cuddise pedimmo ("Don't reproach me, my son"), a song in the Griko language performed by a local
 Franco st'Anguria, Lo "Schiacúddhi" Two plays performed in the local Greek dialect of Choriána (Corigliano d'Otranto)
 Andra mou paei a famous Griko song by Franco Corliano about immigration, with modern Greek translation, performed by Encardia.  The full title of the song is "O Klama jineka u emigrantu", ("Lament of the emigrant's wife") but, commonly, the title is shortened to "Klama" and it's widely known as "Andramu pai" ("My husband goes away")
 Paleariza 2009 Bova Grico di Calabria

Videos
Documentary on the Griko community of Salento (in Greek and Italian):
 Kalos Irtate Sti Grecia Salentina - Part 1, Part 2, Part 3, Part 4
Documentary on the Griko Community of Calabria (Subtitles in Greek and Italian. 60mns):
 Viaggio nella Calabria Greca - Part 1,
 Part 2,
 Part 3, 
 Part 4, 
 Part 5,
 Part 6, 
 Part 7,
 Part 8

Greek diaspora in Europe
Italian people of Greek descent
Ethnic groups in Italy
Magna Graecians